The 1938 North Dakota Fighting Sioux football team, also known as the Nodaks, was an American football team that represented the University of North Dakota in the North Central Conference (NCC) during the 1938 college football season. In its tenth year under head coach Charles A. West, the team compiled a 6–2 record (2–1 against NCC opponents), tied for second place out of seven teams in the NCC, and outscored opponents by a total of 151 to 86. The team opened its season with a victory over the Winnipeg Blue Bombers, a professional football team from Canada.

Schedule

References

North Dakota
North Dakota Fighting Hawks football seasons
North Dakota Fighting Sioux football